Phon Sawan is a district (amphoe) in Nakhon Phanom province, northeast Thailand.

Geography
Neighboring districts are (from the west clockwise): Na Wa, Si Songkhram, Tha Uthen, and Mueang Nakhon Phanom of Nakhon Phanom Province, and Kusuman of Sakon Nakhon province.

History
The minor district (king amphoe) was established on 7 January 1986, when the five tambons, Phon Sawan, Na Hua Bo, Na Khamin, Phon Bok, and Ban Kho, were split off from Tha Uthen district. It was upgraded to a full district on 9 May 1992.

Administration 
The district is divided into seven sub-districts (tambons), which are further subdivided into 86 villages (mubans). Phon Sawan has township (thesaban tambon) status and covers part of tambons Phon Sawan and Phon Chan. There are a further seven tambon administrative organization (TAO).

References

External links
amphoe.com

Phon Sawan